National Council elections were held in the Czech part of Czechoslovakia on 26 and 27 November 1971. They were the first direct elections after the creation of the Czech National Council, whose first members were co-opted in 1968 by the members of National Assembly, elected in 1964.

Results

Seats by gender
150 Male
50 Female

External links
Election Results (Czech)
Mandate and Immunity Committee Message (Czech)

Czech Republic
Legislative elections in Czechoslovakia
Elections to the Chamber of Deputies of the Czech Republic
Single-candidate elections
Czech Republic
Election and referendum articles with incomplete results